2000–01 Albanian Cup was the forty-ninth season of Albania's annual cup competition. It began on 26 August 2000 with the First Round and ended on 26 May 2001 with the Final match. The winners of the competition qualified for the 2001-02 first round of the UEFA Europa League. Teuta were the defending champions, having won their second Albanian Cup last season. The cup was won by Tirana.

The rounds were played in a two-legged format similar to those of European competitions. If the aggregated score was tied after both games, the team with the higher number of away goals advanced. If the number of away goals was equal in both games, the match was decided by extra time and a penalty shootout, if necessary.

First round
Games were played on 26 August – 9 September 2000.

|}

Second round
All sixteen teams of the 1999–00 Superliga and First Division entered in this round. First legs were played on 19 January 2001 and the second legs were played on 27 January 2001.

|}

Quarter-finals
In this round entered the 8 winners from the previous round.

|}

Semi-finals
In this round entered the four winners from the previous round.

|}

Final

References

External links
 Official website 

Cup
2000–01 domestic association football cups
2000-01